Otter Media Holdings, LLC is an American digital media company owned by Warner Bros. Discovery. The company was founded in 2014 by AT&T and The Chernin Group as a holding company of the anime streaming service, Crunchyroll who the latter invested in 2013.
 
In addition to Crunchyroll, it owned Rooster Teeth and held an ownership stake in Gunpowder & Sky with Floris Bauer. AT&T would later acquire the remaining stake of Otter Media in 2018, whose folded under the WarnerMedia subsidiary and later divested Crunchyroll to Sony Pictures Television's subsidiary Funimation in 2021.

History
In April 2014, AT&T and the Chernin Group established Otter Media as the 50:50 joint venture to offer OTT services.

In January 2016, Otter Media invested in Van Toffler (former CEO of Viacom Media Networks Music Group) and Floris Bauer's Gunpowder & Sky, a digital content company, which eventually merged with FilmBuff.

In November 2016, Otter Media and actress Reese Witherspoon formed Hello Sunshine, a joint venture focused on telling female-driven stories on film, TV, and digital platforms; the company was later sold to a media company backed by the Blackstone Group.

In January 2018, Otter Media bought the remaining stake in Ellation, the owner of VRV and Crunchyroll, and integrated it as Otter Media's Consumer Division.

On June 20, 2018, Recode reported that AT&T was close to buying out Chernin's stake in Otter Media, on the heel of its acquisition of Time Warner (whose digital media holdings included Machinima). On August 7, 2018, AT&T announced their acquisition of Chernin Group's stake in Otter Media for an undisclosed amount, believed to be around $1 billion.

On August 22, 2018, Ellation formed Ellation Studios, a production studio with facilities in both the U.S. and Japan, to produce original content for Crunchyroll and VRV.

On December 4, 2018, Otter announced a broad restructuring that would result in the layoff of about ten percent of its staff. As part of the reorganization, Machinima, which had been part of Warner Bros. Digital Networks, was re-organized under Otter Media. Ellation will now house Rooster Teeth, Crunchyroll, and VRV, while Machinima became a unit of Fullscreen.

On March 4, 2019, following the reconstruction of WarnerMedia's businesses, Otter Media became part of Warner Bros. Entertainment. However, on May 31, it was transferred to the WarnerMedia Entertainment division in order to oversee HBO Max.

In September 2019, Crunchyroll announced it had acquired a majority stake in Viz Media Europe from Hitotsubashi Group, and later rebranded Viz Media Europe as Crunchyroll SAS. As a result, the Ellation name was moved from being Otter Media's Consumer Division to Crunchyroll's subsidiary in Moldova, and VRV was made a brand of Crunchyroll.

On December 9, 2020, Sony-owned Funimation announced its acquisition of Crunchyroll from Otter Media for $1.175 billion, which was finalized on August 9, 2021.

Assets

Current
 Rooster Teeth
 Gunpowder & Sky

Former
 Fullscreen - team laid off and company absorbed into WBD Ad Sales 
 McBeard
 Reelio
 Machinima, Inc. - merged into Fullscreen in 2019
 Hello Sunshine (joint venture with Reese Witherspoon, Seth Rodsky and Emerson Creative) - sold
 Crunchyroll (Ellation, LLC) – sold to Sony's Funimation Global Group in 2021
Crunchyroll EMEA
VRV
Crunchyroll Expo
Crunchyroll Anime Awards
Crunchyroll Games

References

External links
 

 
American companies established in 2014
Mass media companies established in 2014
2018 mergers and acquisitions
Warner Bros. Discovery subsidiaries
Companies based in Santa Monica, California